Dmytro Yarchuk (born 23 March 1994) is a professional Ukrainian football midfielder who played for Vilafranquense on loan from Estoril.

Career
Yarchuk made his debut for SC Tavriya Simferopol played in the main-squad team against FC Sevastopol on 3 August 2013 in Ukrainian Premier League.

References

External links

1994 births
Living people
Ukrainian footballers
Association football midfielders
Ukrainian Premier League players
Ukrainian expatriate footballers
Expatriate footballers in Turkey
Ukrainian expatriate sportspeople in Turkey
FC Torpedo Mykolaiv players
SC Tavriya Simferopol players
1461 Trabzon footballers
FC Hirnyk-Sport Horishni Plavni players
G.D. Estoril Praia players
Expatriate footballers in Portugal
Ukrainian expatriate sportspeople in Portugal
Primeira Liga players
MFC Pervomaisk players
FC Vast Mykolaiv players
Sportspeople from Mykolaiv